The Mark Thomas Comedy Product (from series 2 onwards - known as The Mark Thomas Product) was a television show fronted by the English comedian, presenter, political activist and reporter, Mark Thomas and directed by Michael Cumming.  It was broadcast in the UK on Channel 4 from 23 February 1996 to 22 October 2003.

The show, described as "a brilliantly ludicrous alternative to Watchdog",  was a hybrid of comedy and serious politics, with Thomas often using silly or surreal methods to gain interviews with politicians and corporations and to highlight issues.

Episode guide

References

External links
Official Mark Thomas site

1996 British television series debuts
2003 British television series endings
1990s British comedy television series
2000s British comedy television series
Channel 4 original programming
English-language television shows
British non-fiction television series